Suzanne Elizabeth "Suzy" Clarkson (née Aiken) is an author and former New Zealand television personality, who was a news presenter at Prime Television from 2004 to 2010.

She has appeared in the NZ drama Shortland Street, and produced aerobic workout videos and co-authored the book "Healthy Body Healthy Mind". In the late 1980s and early 90s she appeared on the show "Blind Date" where she was the hostess. She was the NZ presenter for the travel programme Getaway for four series and has a postgraduate qualification in broadcast journalism—and before moving into television was a qualified a physiotherapist.

She became Suzy Clarkson after her marriage to Tim Clarkson in early 2006.

She became the anchor and producer for Prime News First at 5:30 from its launch in February 2004. On 15 February 2006 the New Zealand press announced Prime was replacing Clarkson as its news presenter with Alison Mau. However, on 24 February it was reported that Prime had withdrawn its offer after what Mau described as "inexplicably callous treatment", and Eric Young would now be hosting the weekday show, with Clarkson moving to presenting the weekend news and weekday sports news.

She returned to Prime News after a short break for maternity leave following the birth of her first child in July 2007.

In November 2010, it was announced she would be leaving her role as weekend newsreader at Prime.

She subsequently was corporate affairs manager for Coca-Cola Amatil New Zealand. Currently she works as Head of Communications at Metlifecare.

She had a second child in 2013, and published Fit for Birth and Beyond: The guide for women over 35.

See also
List of New Zealand television personalities

References

External links

New Zealand television presenters
New Zealand non-fiction writers
Living people
Year of birth missing (living people)
People from Levin, New Zealand